Donnie or Donny is a masculine given name. It may also refer to:

 Donny!, an American comedy television series
 Donny (album), 1974 album by Donny Osmond
 "Donnie" (song), from the 1998 Ace of Base album Flowers
 "Donnie", a 1968 song by TV host Chuck Barris, B-side of "Baja California"
 "Donnie", a 1974 song by R. Dean Taylor, B-side of "Window Shopping"
 Donny, informal name for Doncaster, a city in England
 Auguste Donny (1851–?), French sailor who competed in the 1900 Summer Olympics
 Jacqueline Donny (1927–2021), French model and beauty pageant contestant, Miss France and Miss Europe 1948